Kanyon (meaning Canyon in Turkish) is a multi-purpose complex located on the Büyükdere Avenue in the Levent business district of Istanbul, Turkey. Opened on 6 June 2006, it unites a 160-store shopping mall (covering an area of 37,500 m2), a 30-floor office tower (26 floors of which rise above street level) and a 22-floor residential block with 179 residential apartments into a complex undulating around a dramatic architectural “canyon”. The total construction area of the project is 250,000 m2, with 30,000 m2 of rentable office area, 37,500 m2 of rentable retail area, 180 residential flats, 160 stores, 9 theater halls with a capacity of 1,600 spectators, and a parking facility for 2,300 vehicles. Each floor of the office tower has a total usable office space of 1,167 m2. The complex rises on an area of 29,427 m2.

Development
Kanyon is a joint venture of the Eczacıbaşı Group and İŞGYO of Turkey. It was designed by The Jerde Partnership of Los Angeles, USA, who collaborated with Tabanlıoğlu Architects of Istanbul, Turkey, for developing the project. The Istanbul office of Ove Arup & Partners undertook the engineering and consultancy works, while Tepe Construction of Istanbul, Turkey, was the main construction company. IMS Engineering of Istanbul, Turkey, was responsible for the project management.

Awards
Kanyon won the 2006 Cityscape Architectural Review Award in the "Commercial Built" category, during a ceremony which was held in Dubai, United Arab Emirates, on 4 December 2006.

See also
 List of shopping malls in Istanbul
 Akmerkez

References

External links
 Emporis: Kanyon
 Emporis: Kanyon image gallery
 Extensive picture gallery

Şişli
Shopping malls in Istanbul
Residential skyscrapers in Istanbul
Skyscraper office buildings in Turkey